Non-starchy vegetables are vegetables that contain a lower proportion of carbohydrates and calories compared to their starchy counterparts. Thus, for the same calories, one can eat a larger quantity of non-starchy vegetables compared to smaller servings of starchy vegetables.

This list may not be complete
 Alfalfa sprouts
 Arugula
 Artichoke
 Asparagus
 Bamboo shoots
 Beans (green, Italian, yellow or wax)
 Bean sprouts
 Beets
 Bok choy
 Broccoli
 Brussels sprouts
 Cabbage
 Cauliflower
 Celery
 Chayote
 Chicory              
 Chinese cabbage
 Chinese spinach
 Cucumber
 Eggplant
 Fennel
 Garlic
 Green onions
 Greens (beet or collard greens, dandelion, kale, mustard, turnip)
 Hearts of palm
 Herbs (parsley, cilantro, basil, rosemary, thyme, etc.)
 Jicama
 Kohlrabi
 Leeks
 Lettuce (endive, escarole, romaine or iceberg)
 Mushrooms
 Okra
 Onions
 Parsley
 Peppers (green, red, yellow, orange, jalapeño)
 Purslane
 Radishes
 Rapini
 Rhubarb
 Rutabaga
 Sauerkraut
 Scallions
 Shallots
 Snow peas or pea pods
 Spinach
 Summer squash
 Swiss chard
 Tomatillos
 Turnips
 Water chestnuts
 Watercress
 Zucchini

References

'
Vegetables, Nonstarchy
Nutrient-rich, low calorie diets
Nutrition